Taylor Nunatak is a large nunatak at the east side of Shackleton Glacier, just south of the terminus of Dick Glacier, in the Queen Maud Mountains. Named by the Southern Party of New Zealand Geological Survey Antarctic Expedition (NZGSAE) (1961–62) for Thomas E. Taylor, topographic surveyor, United States Geological Survey (USGS), who worked near the mouth of Shackleton Glacier in the summers of 1960-61 and 1961–62, and in the Pensacola Mountains, 1962–63.

Nunataks of the Ross Dependency
Dufek Coast